A white elephant (also albino elephant) is a rare kind of elephant, but not a distinct species. In Hindu puranas, the god Indra has a white elephant. Although often depicted as snow white, their skin is normally a soft reddish-brown, turning a light pink when wet. They have fair eyelashes and toenails.  The traditional "white elephant" is commonly misunderstood as being albino, but the Thai term chang samkhan, actually translates as 'auspicious elephant', being  "white" in terms of an aspect of purity.

White elephants are only nominally white. Of those currently kept by the Burmese rulers—General Than Shwe regards himself as the heir of the Burmese kings—one is grey and the other three are pinkish, but all are officially white. The king of Thailand also keeps a number of white elephants, eleven of which are still alive .

Persia
There were white elephants in the army of the Sasanian king Khusrau II. According to al-Tabari, a white elephant killed the commander of the Arab Muslims Abu Ubayd al-Thaqafi in the Battle of the Bridge. White elephants were considered royalty by Arabs and rode by caliphs. Abul-Abbas, a white elephant was gifted to Charlemagne by Harun al-Rashid, the fifth Abbasid caliph.

Hinduism

The god Indra is said to possess a white elephant named Airavata, which possesses the ability to fly. Airavata is made king of all elephants by Indra.

King Bimbisara had a white elephant, which he had captured in a forest when the elephant was in his musth period. He named the bull elephant Sechanaka, which means "watering", as the elephant used to water the plants by himself without any prior training. It is said the cost of this elephant was more the half of Magadha. He later gave it to his son Vihallakumara, which made his other son Ajatashatru jealous.  Ajatashatru tried to steal it many times, which resulted in two of the most terrible wars, called the Mahasilakantaka & Ratha-musala (see Ajatashatru).

Thailand

"According to Brahmanic belief, if a monarch possessed one or more 'white' elephants, it was a glorious and happy sign."  King Trailok possessed the first.  In the Thai language, they are called albino, not white, indicating "pale yellow eyes and white nails", with white hair.  The "rough skin was either pink all over or had pink patches on the head, trunk, or forelegs."  "They were not worshipped for themselves and were regarded as an appendage to the King's majesty."

In Thailand, white elephants (ช้างเผือก, chang phueak) (also known as Pink Elephants) are considered sacred and are a symbol of royal power; all those discovered are presented to the king (although this presentation is usually a ceremonial one—the elephants are not actually taken into captivity). Historically, the status of kings has been evaluated by the number of white elephants in their possession. The late king Bhumibol Adulyadej owned as many as 21 white elephants — considered an unprecedented achievement, making him the monarch who owned the greatest number of chang phueak in Thai history. The first elephant found in King Bhumibol's reign was regarded as the most important elephant in the whole realm; it received a royal title which bears his majesty's own name: Phra Savet Adulyadej Pahol Bhumibol Navanatta-parami (พระเศวตอดุลยเดชพาหล ภูมิพลนวนาถบารมี). However, the King did not bestow royal titles to all of the white elephants in his possession. , eleven of these elephants are still alive and only five have royal titles.  

A white elephant in Thailand is not necessarily albino, although it must have pale skin. After being discovered, the elephants are assigned to one of four graded categories before being offered to the king, although the lower grades are sometimes refused.

In the past, lower grade white elephants were given as gifts to the king's friends and allies. The animals needed a lot of care and, being sacred, could not be put to work, so were a great financial burden on the recipient - only the monarch and the very rich could afford them.
According to one story, white elephants were sometimes given as a present to some enemy (often a lesser noble with whom the king was displeased). The unfortunate recipient, unable to make any profit from it, and obliged to take care of it, would suffer bankruptcy and ruin.

Myanmar

In Myanmar as well, white elephants have been revered symbols of power and good fortune. The announcement by the ruling military regime of the finding of white elephants in 2001 and 2002 was seen by opponents as being aimed at bolstering support for their regime. , Myanmar has nine white elephants (as of February 2014). The last white elephant was found in Basein area, in the South-Western part of Myanmar on 27 February 2015. Three white elephants are currently held in a pavilion on the outskirts of Yangon. The rest are kept at Uppatasanti Pagoda in Naypyidaw, the new Myanmar administrative capital.

Africa

Albinos are much more rare among African elephants than in Asia. They are reddish-brown or pink, and may suffer blindness or skin problems from sun exposure.

Western cultural references

In English, the term "white elephant" has come to mean a spectacular and prestigious thing that is more trouble than it is worth, or has outlived its usefulness to the person who has it. While the item may be useful to others, its current owner would usually be glad to be rid of it.

See also
Abul-Abbas, a (possibly) white elephant given to Charlemagne by Harun al-Rashid
Airavata, a white elephant whom the god Indra rides
Hanno, the pet of Pope Leo X
Seeing pink elephants, a euphemistic term for visual hallucination arising from alcohol intoxication
White elephant gift exchange, a popular winter holiday party game in the U.S.

References

External links
 – Story and history of Royal White Elephants 
The Royal White Elephants, 2002, Mahidol University

Elephants in culture
Burmese culture
Thai culture
African culture